Phocas Nikwigize (23 August 1919 – 30 November 1996) was a Rwandan bishop in the Roman Catholic Church.

Nikwigize born in Muhango, Rwanda, and was ordained a priest on 25 July 1948. He was appointed bishop of the Diocese of Ruhengeri and ordained bishop on 30 November 1968. Nikiwigize remained in this post until his retirement on 5 January 1996.

On 27 November 1996, he was traveling to re-enter Rwanda with missionaries when he was seized by members of a Rwandan Patriotic Army and was believed to be killed on 30 November 1996.

See also
Diocese of Ruhengeri

External links
 Catholic Hierarchy

References

1919 births
1996 deaths
20th-century Roman Catholic bishops in Rwanda
Roman Catholic bishops of Ruhengeri
Rwandan Roman Catholic bishops